Mount Austin Playground is a park and playground along Mount Austin Road, at Victoria Peak, Hong Kong.

References

External links

 

Parks in Hong Kong
Victoria Peak